Neil Marshall (born 25 May 1970) is an English film and television director, editor, producer, and screenwriter. He directed the horror films Dog Soldiers (2002) and The Descent (2005), the science fiction action film Doomsday (2008), the historical war film Centurion (2010), the superhero action film Hellboy (2019), and the adventure horror film The Reckoning (2020).

Marshall has also directed numerous television series, including two episodes of the HBO fantasy drama series Game of Thrones: "Blackwater" and "The Watchers on the Wall", the latter of which earned him a nomination for the Primetime Emmy Award for Outstanding Directing for a Drama Series.

Early life
Marshall was born in Newcastle upon Tyne, England. He was inspired to become a film director when he saw Raiders of the Lost Ark (1981) at the age of eleven. He began making home movies using Super 8 mm film, and in 1989, he attended film school at Newcastle Polytechnic. In the next eight years, he worked as a freelance film editor.

Career
In 1995, he was hired to co-write and edit for director Bharat Nalluri's first film, Killing Time. Marshall continued to write and develop his own projects, directing his first film in 2002, Dog Soldiers, a horror film that became a cult film in the United Kingdom and the United States. In 2005, he followed up with a second horror film, The Descent. With his direction of The Descent, he was identified as a member of the Splat Pack. Marshall won the British Independent Film Award for Best Director, and the film received the Saturn Award for Best Horror Film. 

His next film, Doomsday, is a 2008 science fiction action film he wrote and directed. The film takes place in the future in Scotland, which has been quarantined because of a deadly virus. When the virus is found in London, political leaders send a team led by Major Eden Sinclair (Rhona Mitra) to Scotland to find a possible cure. Sinclair's team runs into two types of survivors: marauders and medieval knights.

Doomsday was conceived by Marshall based on the idea of futuristic soldiers facing medieval knights. In producing the film, he drew inspiration from various movies, including Mad Max, Escape from New York and 28 Days Later. Marshall had a budget three times the size of his previous two films. The director filmed the larger-scale Doomsday in Scotland and South Africa. The film was released on 14 March 2008 in the United States and Canada and in the United Kingdom on 9 May 2008. Doomsday did not perform well at the box office, and critics gave the film mixed reviews. Rotten Tomatoes reported that 49% of critics gave the film positive write-ups, based on a sample of 69, with an average score of 5.1/10.  At Metacritic, which assigns a normalised rating out of 100 to reviews from mainstream critics, the film has received an average score of 51, based on 14 reviews. 

Marshall went on to write and direct the 2010 historical war film Centurion, starring Michael Fassbender and Dominic West. He also wrote and directed a segment, titled 
"Bad Seed", of the anthology horror film Tales of Halloween, which had its world premiere on 24 July 2015 at the Fantasia International Film Festival. 

Marshall directed episodes of multiple television series, including Black Sails, Constantine, Hannibal, Westworld, Timeless, and Lost in Space, the lattermost two of which he also executive produced. He was nominated for a Primetime Emmy Award for Outstanding Directing for a Drama Series for his work on the Game of Thrones episode "The Watchers on the Wall". In February 2015, Marshall and his agent Marc Helwig founded the television production company Applebox Entertainment and signed with this company, a two-year deal with Legendary TV.

In 2017, Marshall signed on to direct a reboot of Hellboy, released in April 2019. Marshall has since disowned the film, criticizing the script and calling the job "the worst professional experience of my life." Marshall only accepted the film due to not making a feature film in nine years and also being initially intrigued by the horror pitch. 

He then wrote and directed the horror film The Reckoning, which was released in 2020. With actress Charlotte Kirk, he created a production company, Scarlett Productions.

Filmography

Film

Executive producer only
 The Descent Part 2 (2009)
 Soulmate (2013)
 Dark Signal (2016)

Television

Writer
 Dog Soldiers: Legacy (2011) (Pilot episode)

Awards and nominations

References

External links

Harbinger Of Doom interview Future Movies

1970 births
Alumni of Northumbria University
English film directors
Horror film directors
English screenwriters
English male screenwriters
Hugo Award winners
Living people
People from Newcastle upon Tyne